Wonky may refer to:
 Wonky (genre), a music genre that appeared before summer 2008
 Wonky (album), a 2012 album by Orbital
 Wonky pop, a loose grouping of musical acts that played what the BBC called "quirky, catchy and credible pop"

See also
 Wonk (disambiguation)
 Wonky hole, a submarine freshwater spring on the seabed in the Great Barrier Reef or the Gulf of Carpentaria of Queensland